Spain's national rugby sevens team is one of 15 core teams participating in all ten tournaments of the World Rugby Sevens Series, having qualified by winning the 2017 Hong Kong Sevens qualifier tournament. Spain participated as a core team in the 2012–13 IRB Sevens World Series, but was relegated the following season.

The team trains together at the country's Olympic training facilities in Madrid, which itself has been a result of the sport entering its first Olympic cycle. Spain won the 2016 Olympic qualifying repechage tournament by beating Samoa 22–19 to qualify for the last available qualifying spot for the 2016 Summer Olympics.

The team also competes annually in Rugby Europe's Sevens Grand Prix Series tournament.

Tournament history

Summer Olympic Games

Rugby World Cup Sevens

World Rugby Sevens Series

Spain started off the 2012–13 IRB Sevens Series with a bang at the 2012 Gold Coast Sevens, defeating core teams Wales and England to finish ninth and win the Bowl. Pedro Martin led Spain in scoring in the 2012 Gold Coast Sevens, contributing 5 tries and 27 points, while Pablo Feijoo added 4 tries and 22 points.

Spain was elevated to "core team" status for the 2012–13 IRB Sevens World Series, following its performance in qualifying at the 2012 Hong Kong Sevens. At that tournament, Spain defeated Zimbabwe, Philippines, Tonga and Japan to reach the finals, where it lost to Canada. Spain participated in other events during the 2011–12 IRB Sevens World Series. In that season, Spain played in the 2012 Scotland Sevens, reaching the Bowl finals, and the 2012 London Sevens, reaching the Cup quarterfinal.

Spain's best finish on the World Series was the 2017–18 season where Spain finished 11th.

Team

Current squad

Former squads

Coach
Pablo Feijoo has served as head coach of the Spain national rugby sevens team since the 2016–17 season. He played in the 2013 Rugby World Cup Sevens in Russia, and was a member of the squad that defeated  to secure a place in the 2016 Summer Olympics.

Feijoo replaced Ignacio "Tiki" Inchausti, who played in Spain's only ever appearance at the 1999 fifteens Rugby World Cup, and also played at the Rugby World Cup Sevens in 2001 in Mar del Plata. Prior to his appointment to the men's team, Inchausti was in charge of Spain's women's squad, whom he managed to qualify for the inaugural participation of women in the tournament in Dubai in 2009. Inchausti coached the Spanish men's men's side from 2010, helping them qualify as a core team in 2012.

Player records
Most tries:
 Pol Pla (69)
 Manuel Sainz-Trapaga (37)
 Pablo Fontes (37)

2008 Hannover Sevens
Group A matches

See also
 Spain women's national rugby sevens team

References
 McLaren, Bill A Visit to Hong Kong in Starmer-Smith, Nigel & Robertson, Ian (eds) The Whitbread Rugby World '90 (Lennard Books, 1989)

External links
Official website
WorldRugby profile

Sevenz
National rugby sevens teams